National Rock Review (NRR) is an American website dedicated to rock music news, as well as interviews, concert photography, album and music DVD reviews.

History 
The website was founded in September 2013 by Mick McDonald, owner of NRR Media LLC, a music entertainment publishing company dedicated to covering local and national artists in North America and Europe.

National Rock Review is formed by a network of concert reviewers, music photographers and music release reviewers collaborating with the music industry to provide a global coverage of musical events and releases.

Dave Ball is the current managing editor and director of the National Rock Review.

References

External links 
 Official website

Rock music mass media
American entertainment news websites
Internet properties established in 2013
2013 establishments in the United States